The Herald-Press is the only daily newspaper published in Huntington County, Indiana.

The newspaper was founded in 1848 as the Indiana Herald. In 1887 it was renamed to Huntington Herald, and in 1930 it merged with Huntington Press and became the  Herald-Press. In the early 1960s, the paper was purchased by James C. Quayle, whose wife Corrine was the daughter of newspaper magnate Eugene C. Pulliam. Quayle had previously worked for Pulliam's Central Newspapers, Inc., which was the prior owner.

In 1988, when George H. W. Bush announced his preference for Dan Quayle, Jim & Corrine's son, as candidate for Vice President of the United States, the celebration was at the Huntington, Indiana courthouse, less than a hundred feet from Dan & Marilyn Quayle's apartment above the Herald-Press office.

Jim Quayle was a member of the John Birch Society and continued to follow the Central Newspapers policy of publishing a strongly partisan newspaper. That doesn't mean they buried stories unfavorable to Dan Quayle. When news stories circulated that Dan Quayle had used family influence to get into the National Guard, Frank Caperton showed the story to Pulliam before publishing it. All he said was, 'Seems pretty straightforward to me,'  Caperton related.

James Quayle died July 7, 2000, and in May 2007, Corrine Quayle sold the paper to Paxton Media Group.

References

External links 
 The Herald-Press online edition
 Info on Herald-Press at Indiana Find

Huntington County, Indiana
Newspapers published in Indiana